

The Fokker D.II was a German fighter biplane of World War I. It was a single-seat fighter aircraft developed before the Fokker D.I. It was based on the M.17 prototype, with single-bay unstaggered wings and a larger fuselage and shorter span than production D.IIs. Using a 75 kW (100 hp) Oberursel U.I, the D.II was underpowered, though the single 7.92 mm (.312 in) lMG 08 machine gun was normal for 1916. The German Army purchased 177.

Operational history
In service, the D.II proved to be little better than the earlier Fokker Eindecker fighters - in particular, it was outclassed by the Nieuport 11 and 17. A few examples were used by the Kampfeinsitzerkommandos and the early Jagdstaffeln alongside the Halberstadt D.II but the early Fokker biplanes were quickly discarded when the new Albatros fighters came out.

Operators

Luftstreitkräfte

Koninklijke Marine

Swiss Air Force

Specifications (D.II)

References

 
 

1910s German fighter aircraft
D 02
Rotary-engined aircraft
Biplanes
Aircraft first flown in 1916